The following is a list of episodes for the CGI animated series, Babar and the Adventures of Badou. The series is co-produced by Nelvana and TeamTO in association with The Clifford Ross Company, TF1, YTV, and LuxAnimation. The series premiered on November 22, 2010 on YTV in Canada, but was later moved to Treehouse TV. It has been sold to various channels worldwide.

Series overview

Episodes

Season 1 (2010–12)

Season 2 (2013–14)

Season 3 (2014–15)

References

Babar
Lists of French animated television series episodes
Babar the Elephant